Andrew F. Bunner (1841–1897) was an American painter and draughtsman. He lived in Manhattan, and he specialized in marine and landscape watercolors. His work is in the permanent collections of the Metropolitan Museum of Art and the National Gallery of Art.

References

1841 births
1897 deaths
People from Manhattan
American draughtsmen
American landscape painters
American male painters
American marine artists
American watercolorists
Painters from New York City
19th-century American painters
19th-century American male artists